Goleba is a genus of African jumping spiders that was first described by F. R. Wanless in 1980.

Species
 it contains five species, found only in Africa:
Goleba jocquei Szüts, 2001 – Congo
Goleba lyra Maddison & Zhang, 2006 – Madagascar
Goleba pallens (Blackwall, 1877) – Seychelles
Goleba puella (Simon, 1885) (type) – Ghana, Congo, Kenya, Angola, South Africa
Goleba punctata (Peckham, Peckham & Wheeler, 1889) – Madagascar

References

Further reading

External links
 Photograph of G. puella

Salticidae genera
Salticidae
Spiders of Africa